Seyf, also rendered as Saif or Sef, may refer to:
 Deh-e Seyf, Kerman Province
 Seyf, Rafsanjan, Kerman Province
 Seyf-e Olya, Kurdistan Province
 Seyf-e Sofla, Kurdistan Province